Robert Morrison (31 March 1896–1974) was an English footballer who played in the Football League for New Brighton and Stockport County.

References

1896 births
1974 deaths
English footballers
Association football midfielders
English Football League players
Hyde United F.C. players
Stalybridge Celtic F.C. players
Stockport County F.C. players
New Brighton F.C. players
Macclesfield Town F.C. players